, known in the United States as Robby the Rascal, is a 39-episode anime television series created by Ken Ishikawa and produced by Knack animation studio. The series aired on TV Tokyo in Japan from October 1982 to June 1983. The series featured contributions from Tetsuro Amino as a storyboard artist and Masayuki Kojima as an episode director.

A feature-length English-dubbed version comprising several episodes edited together into a movie, titled Robby the Rascal, was produced by Jim Terry's (Force Five) Kidpix Productions and released on home video in the United States in 1985.  (The same American distributors had previously adapted the same animation studio's 1979–1980 TV series Manga Sarutobi Sasuke, which used much of the same production team, into a similar feature-length work titled Ninja the Wonder Boy.) However, the English version deleted much of the risque humor that, while not uncommon in children's animation in Japan, would be considered unacceptable by American standards, with the policewoman Sachiko (Sgt. Sally) being the usual target of the fan service-oriented humor. The TV series also aired in its entirety in Italy under the title Robottino ("Little robot"), and some episodes are also available in Spanish as Robotete or Robotín.

Story

Apparently inspired largely by Akira Toriyama's popular Dr. Slump, Robby the Rascal is the story of Robby (Robotchi), a fun-loving, mischievous robot with a TV set in his stomach. Robby lives in a peaceful village with various other robots, all created by the eccentric and lecherous Dr. Art Deco, who has a major crush on local policewoman Sgt. Sally (Sachiko).  Although he is an android and (usually inadvertently) causes much mischief, Robby has a warm, kind heart and is always willing to help out a friend in need. With his human girlfriend Tiffany (Kurumi Yukino), he gets into a variety of wacky adventures.

However, a rich, spoiled inventor named Horace (Highbrow) will stop at nothing to get Robby for his own. Much of the plot of the English feature-length dub of the anime involves Horace's attempts to threaten the peace in Robby's village, with the help of his female assistants, Tracy and Yvette.  For example, in one story arc, Horace uses an illusion-causing ray gun to spoil Robby and Tiffany's spring picnic and then manages to capture the little robot and force him to compete in a high-stakes game of tennis. In another, he follows Robby, Dr. Deco and their friends to Europe, where he and Robby square off in a medieval-style joust. And in the final story arc, Horace and his minions compete against Robby and Tiffany in a global race in which the first prize is $10 million, which Dr. Deco hopes to use to start an amusement park.

Music

The Japanese opening and ending themes to the Cybot Robotchi TV series were performed by Yukari Sato. The Italian dubbed version of the TV series kept all of the original music, including the Japanese theme songs, and also retained most of the original character names (except for Robotchi who became "Robottino"). However, for the English version, the original music was replaced by a new soundtrack by Bullets, including several original songs.

Staff

Japanese Version
Source(s)
 Created by: Ken Ishikawa, Toyohiro Ando
 Chief director: Kazuyuki Okasako
 Assistant director: Hiroyuki Kamii (eps. 1-21)
 Storyboard/Episode directors: Kazuyuki Okasako, Hiroyuki Kamii, Hiroshi Yoshida, Osamu Inoe, Tetsuro Amino, Masayuki Kojima
 Script: Ayuko Anzai, Hideki Sonoda, Susumu Yoshida, Toyohiro Ando, Yoshiyuki Suga
 Character design: Dynamic Planning
 Animation directors: Hiromi Nakamura, Noboru Akiyama, Takao Suzuki, Kinuko Izumi
 Art director: Masayoshi Banno
 Director of photography: Yosuke Moriguchi
 Music: Jun Irie
 Producers: Hyota Ezu (TV Tokyo), Hiroshi Toida
 Theme Songs: OP- Cybot Robotchi (lyrics by Yukari Sato, composition by Tetsuro Oda, arrangement by Jun Irie), ED- Wai! Wai! Wai! (lyrics by Yukari Sato, composition and arrangement by Jun Irie)
 Theme song performance: Yukari Sato
 Voice Cast: Natsumi Sakuma (Robotchi), Hiroshi Masuoka (Dr. Deko), Aya Mizoguchi (Sylvie), Yoko Kawanami (Kurumi), Masako Miura (Uzura), Nobuo Tomita (Bob), Eiko Yamada (Sachiko)
 Production: Knack Co., Ltd. / TV Tokyo

English Version
 Opening credits
 Executive Producer: Joseph Adelman
 Original Music by Bullets
 Written by Collins Walker
 Produced and Directed by Jim Terry
 Closing credits
 The End/A Jim Terry Production
 Edited by Collins Walker
 Assistant Editor: James Terry Jr.
 Production Assistant: John Terry
 Cast of Characters: Ed Victor, Sandra Allyson, Reed Harmon, Tae McMullen, Scott Schwimer, Brenda Colbreth
 ©MCMLXXXV Kidpix – Knack Kikaku, Inc.

References

External links
 
 Cybot Robotchi  at allcinema
 Robby the Rascal at the Internet Movie Database
 Robottino  at CartoniOnline
 Information and scans of Japanese Cybot Robotchi toys

1982 anime television series debuts
Comedy anime and manga
Knack Productions
TV Tokyo original programming